Alexey Zaitsev (born 17 September 1993) is a Russian bobsledder. He competed in the four-man event at the 2018 Winter Olympics.

Personal life
Zaitsev began dating Russian  gymnast Aliya Mustafina in the fall of 2015 after meeting at a hospital where both were recovering from sports injuries. They married on 3 November 2016 in his hometown of Krasnodar.

In January 2017, it was announced that Aliya was pregnant and that the baby was due in July. Mustafina gave birth to a girl named Alisa (Алиса) Mustafina-Zaytseva on 9 June 2017.  On 29 April 2018, Mustafina announced that they had divorced one month earlier.

References

External links
 

1993 births
Living people
Russian male bobsledders
Olympic bobsledders of Russia
Bobsledders at the 2018 Winter Olympics
Bobsledders at the 2022 Winter Olympics
Place of birth missing (living people)